1491 is a musical centered around Christopher Columbus before his voyage to discover the New World. Music and lyrics are by American composer and playwright Meredith Willson. It was Willson's final musical.  The book was by Willson and Richard Morris with additional material by Ira Barmak and was based on an idea by Ed Ainsworth.

Creation
It was intended to have the show open in California in 1967, before transferring to Broadway. The previous two years were spent researching Columbus and traveling in Spain and Italy for possible material.

Production History
The musical, produced by the Los Angeles Civic Light Opera, opened in Los Angeles on September 2, 1969, and later transferred to San Francisco where it closed on December 13, 1969.  The musical closed before reaching Broadway.  Richard Morris was the director, Edwin Lester was the producer, and Danny Daniels was the choreographer.  John Cullum starred as Christopher Columbus and Chita Rivera starred as his mistress.  Jean Fenn played Queen Isabella.  Sergio Franchi was previously cast as Columbus.

References

1969 musicals
Musicals by Meredith Willson
Musicals inspired by real-life events